The mausoleum of Baba Hatim was built in the 11th and 12th centuries. It is outside the town of Imam Sahib in Kunduz Province, Afghanistan, near its border with Tajikistan.

Restoration 
The mausoleum was restored between 1978 and 1979 by the Délégation Archéologique Française en Afghanistan and l'Institut Afghan d'Archéologie. Prior to the restorations, the tomb was structurally unstable, with layers of bricks missing from the exterior's upper walls. Excavating the walls to reveal their original height, the restoration team replaced the missing bricks, restoring the exterior's original cubical shape and the four octagonal colonettes embedded at its corners. The dome was reassembled with new mortar, and refinished on the exterior with plaster and pairs of bricks protruding in four concentric rings. The dome's circular and octagonal drums were also reconstructed, and a metal finial placed atop it.

Other names 
The Baba Hatim Tomb is also known as Baba Hatem Ziyarat, Baba Hatom Ziarat, and Tomb of Salar Khalil (Salar Kalil, Salar Chalil Sayyid).

References
Archnet 
iranica.com 
 Emam Sahib - Baba Hatim Tomb

Ziyarat
Dargahs
Shrines in Afghanistan